Jean Levavasseur (8 June 1924 – 10 February 1999) was a French fencer. He won a bronze medal in the team sabre event at the 1952 Summer Olympics.

In the 1950 World Fencing Championships held in Monte Carlo, Monaco, he won a gold medal in the men's individual sabre event and a silver in the team sabre event.

References

External links
 

1924 births
1999 deaths
French male sabre fencers
Olympic fencers of France
Fencers at the 1948 Summer Olympics
Fencers at the 1952 Summer Olympics
Olympic bronze medalists for France
Olympic medalists in fencing
Medalists at the 1952 Summer Olympics
20th-century French people